R Monocerotis, abbreviated R Mon, is a very young binary star system in the equatorial constellation of Monoceros. The apparent magnitude of R Mon varies between 10 and 12 and the spectral type is B8IIIe.

This is a massive Herbig Ae/Be star, a type of pre-main-sequence star that is surrounded by an orbiting circumstellar disk of gas and dust. Because of this dust, the star is obscured from direct visual sight but can still be observed in the infrared. R Mon is still in the accretion phase of star formation and it is driving an optically opaque bipolar outflow with a velocity of 9 km/s. The northern flow is blue-shifted, and thus moving more toward the Sun.

This system is located in a diffuse nebula called "Hubble's Variable Nebula" (NGC 2261), which is being illuminated by a conical beam of light from the primary.

References

Further reading

External links
 

Herbig Ae/Be stars
T Tauri stars
Circumstellar disks
Monoceros (constellation)
Monocerotis, R
Binary stars